Coniesta williami is a moth in the family Crambidae. It was described by Joseph de Joannis in 1927. It is found in Mozambique and Namibia.

References

Haimbachiini
Moths described in 1927
Moths of Sub-Saharan Africa
Lepidoptera of Mozambique
Lepidoptera of Namibia